Alexandra Zaharias (born 1929) is an American ballet teacher.

Alexandra School of Ballet 
Alexandra Zaharias is the founder and director of the Alexandra School of Ballet, a pre-professional ballet program established in 1949 in Saint Louis, Missouri. She was the director of the Missouri Concert Ballet prior to founding the Alexandra Ballet Company in 1984. That year, Alexandra Ballet received the first Astral Foundation Choreographers Award from the National Association for Regional Ballet.

In 1949, Alexandra Zaharias first opened the Alexandra School of Ballet at Olive and Boyle in the city of St. Louis, Missouri. Prior to 1949, there were few ballet schools or ballet teachers in St. Louis. Alexandra Zaharias went to New York to study at the School of American Ballet under George Balanchine after seeing legendary ballerina Alexandra Danilova dance Swan Lake at the Kiel Opera House.

As the Artistic Director of Alexandra Ballet, she has overseen the production of more than 60 different ballets from classical to modern works.  Since 1949, she has trained thousands of students in classical ballet and helped dozens of ballet dancers become professional dancers.

Alexandra Ballet students 
Students of Alexandra Zaharias have gone on to careers with many of the major ballet companies around the world, including: Alvin Ailey Dance, American Ballet Theatre, Ballet Hispanico, Basel Ballet (Switzerland), Charleston Ballet, Cincinnati Ballet, Dance Theatre of Harlem, Houston Ballet, Joffrey Ballet, Milwaukee Ballet, Verb Ballets, National Ballet of Canada, New York City Ballet, Pacific Northwest Ballet, Pennsylvania Ballet Theatre, Richmond Ballet, Royal Birmingham Ballet (UK), and San Francisco Ballet.

History 
Ms. Zaharias received her early training in St. Louis, Missouri from Isabella Rainford, and continued her studies at the School of American Ballet in New York City under the legendary George Balanchine. She attended the National Academy of Ballet, under the direction of Thalia Mara, renowned teacher, author, and later founder of the USA International Ballet Competition, held in Jackson, Mississippi. 

Miss Zaharias was National Dance Chairperson for the National Society of Arts and Letters, and past president of the St. Louis Chapter. She has served as co-director of the Midwestern Music and Arts Camp, University of Kansas, and taught ballet at Fontbonne University in Clayton, Missouri. She was Dance Consultant for the St. Louis Board of Education Commission and served as dance panelist for the Missouri Arts Council and Regional Arts Commission. She has directed four seasons of The Nutcracker, and choreographed KinderKonzerts and Young People's Concerts for the St. Louis Symphony Orchestra.

In 1991, Miss Zaharias received the Hellenic American Achievement Award for her work in the arts. She was honored in 1999 by the Arts & Education Council of Greater St. Louis as a recipient of one of their coveted Excellence in the Arts Awards, in recognition of 50 years of dedicated service to her students and her audiences.  In 2009 she was selected as an Ageless-Remarkable St. Louisan Honoree.

Miss Zaharias is Past President of the St. Louis Chapter of the National Society of Arts and Letters, has served as a dance panelist for the Missouri Arts Council and the Regional Arts Commission of St. Louis, is Past President of Regional Dance America/Mid-States and currently served as Historian for its National Board.

References

 Raising the Barre Alexandra Zaharias Alexandra Ballet
 Ballet teacher, 80, is an 'Ageless' star SEEN AROUND STL
 Alexandra Ballet youth one of the nation's best

1929 births
Living people
Ballet teachers
American ballerinas
Artists from St. Louis
University of Kansas staff
School of American Ballet alumni
Fontbonne University faculty